Maria Areosa (full name: Maria Costa Macedo Areosa Ribeiro, born 14 September 1984) is a professional Portuguese triathlete, Portuguese Duathlon Champion of the year 2010, and permanent member of the National Team.

In the official Portuguese ranking of the year 2010, Areosa is at the 14th position but since she attended only one of the four competitions of the circuit this ranking is not relevant.

In 2010, Areosa also took part in the Portuguese triathlon of the XTERRA European Tour, placing 3rd at Figueira da Foz.

In Portugal, Maria Areosa represents the Clube Olímpico de Oeiras.

ITU Competitions 
In the ten years from 2001 to 2010, Areosa took part in 31 ITU triathlons and achieved 11 top ten positions, among which two gold medals. In April 2011, Areosa opened her new season with a new top ten position in Quarteira.
The following list is based upon the official ITU rankings and the ITU Athletes's Profile Page.
Unless indicated otherwise, the following events are triathlons (Olympic Distance) and refer to the Elite category.

Notes

External links 
 Portuguese Triathlon Federation in Portuguese

1984 births
Living people
Portuguese female triathletes